is a Japanese football player. She plays for Urawa Reds and Japan national team.

Club career
Ikeda was born in Saitama on September 8, 1992. In 2011, she was promoted to Urawa Reds from youth team.

National team career
In 2008, Ikeda played for the Japan U-17 national team at the 2008 U-17 World Cup. In 2012, she also played for the Japan U-20 national team at the 2012 U-20 World Cup, and Japan won third place. In 2017, she was selected for the Japan national team, when they played in the 2017 Algarve Cup. At this competition, on March 6, she played against Norway. She was a member of Japan for the 2018 Asian Cup and Japan won the championship. She played 14 games for Japan.

National team statistics

References

External links

Japan Football Association

1992 births
Living people
Nippon Sport Science University alumni
Association football people from Saitama Prefecture
Japanese women's footballers
Japan women's international footballers
Nadeshiko League players
Urawa Red Diamonds Ladies players
Women's association football goalkeepers
Footballers at the 2018 Asian Games
Asian Games gold medalists for Japan
Asian Games medalists in football
Medalists at the 2018 Asian Games
Universiade silver medalists for Japan
Universiade medalists in football
2019 FIFA Women's World Cup players
Medalists at the 2011 Summer Universiade
Footballers at the 2020 Summer Olympics
Olympic footballers of Japan